The 2013–14 Northern Football League season was the 116th in the history of Northern Football League, a football competition in England.

Division One

Division One featured 21 clubs which competed in the division last season, along with two new clubs, promoted from Division Two:
 Crook Town
 Morpeth

From this league, three teams - Bishop Auckland, Celtic Nation and Spennymoor Town - applied for promotion.

League table

Results

Stadia

Division Two

Division Two featured 18 clubs which competed in the division last season, along with four new clubs:
 Heaton Stannington, promoted from the Northern Football Alliance
 Norton & Stockton Ancients, relegated from Division One
 South Shields, relegated from Division One
 Willington, promoted from the Wearside Football League

League table

Results

Stadiums

References

External links
 Northern League

2013-14
9